Prem Nampratueng (born 4 June 1995) is a Thai rower. He won the bronze medal in the men's double sculls and men's quadruple sculls events at the 2018 Asian Games held in Jakarta and Palembang, Indonesia. He has also won medals at the Asian Rowing Championships and the Southeast Asian Games.

He competed in the men's double sculls and men's quadruple sculls events at the  2014 Asian Games held in Chungju, South Korea.

References

Living people
1995 births
Place of birth missing (living people)
Prem Nampratueng
Rowers at the 2014 Asian Games
Rowers at the 2018 Asian Games
Prem Nampratueng
Asian Games medalists in rowing
Medalists at the 2018 Asian Games
Southeast Asian Games medalists in rowing
Prem Nampratueng
Prem Nampratueng
Competitors at the 2015 Southeast Asian Games
Competitors at the 2021 Southeast Asian Games
Prem Nampratueng